The Wagga City Open was a golf tournament played in Wagga Wagga, New South Wales, Australia in the 1960s.

Prize money was £750 in 1962, £1,000 in 1964 and 1965, A$2,000 in 1966 and 1967, and A$3,000 in 1968 and 1969.

Winners
This list is incomplete

References 

Golf tournaments in Australia
Golf in New South Wales
Recurring sporting events established in 1962
Recurring sporting events disestablished in 1969
1962 establishments in Australia
1969 disestablishments in Australia
Sport in Wagga Wagga